大田 means "large field" in Chinese characters, and may refer to:
Ōta, Ōita, a former village in Nishikunisaki, Ōita, Japan
Ōda, Shimane, a city in Shimane, Japan
Ōta, Tokyo, a special ward of Tokyo, Japan

People with the surname 
Hiroko Ōta (born 1954), Japanese politician and a researcher of economics
Masahide Ōta (1925–2017), former governor of Okinawa, Japan
Nanami Ohta (born 1993), Japanese actress
Ōta Nanpo, Japanese poet and fiction writer
Princess Ōta (644–668), eldest daughter of Emperor Tenji

See also 
Datianwan Stadium, a multi-use stadium in Chongqing, China
Ohta (disambiguation)